Elections to Oxford City Council were held on 2 May 2002.  The whole council was up for election with boundary changes since the last election in 2000 reducing the number of seats by three. The Labour Party gained control of the council.  The number of Councillors for each party after the election were Labour 29, Liberal Democrat 15, Green 3 and Independent Working Class Association 1. Overall turnout was 34%.

Election result

|}

Ward results

See also
2002 United Kingdom local elections
Elections in the United Kingdom

References

2002
2002 English local elections
2000s in Oxford